Shuntarō, Shuntaro or Shuntarou (written:  or ) is a masculine Japanese given name. Notable people with the name include:

, Japanese businessman
, Japanese physician
, Japanese historian and educator
, Czech sumo wrestler
, Japanese poet and translator
, Japanese journalist and activist

Japanese masculine given names